Samuel Augustus Mitchell (1790, Bristol, Connecticut – December 20, 1868, Philadelphia) was an American geographer.

He was born in Connecticut. Mitchell worked as a teacher before turning to publishing geography textbooks and maps. He became involved in geography after teaching and realizing that there were so many poor quality geographical resources available to teachers. He moved to Philadelphia, Pennsylvania in either 1829 or 1830. He was in Philadelphia when he founded his company. His son, S. Augustus Mitchell, became owner in 1860. Their publications covered all genres of geography: maps, travel guides, textbooks, and more. Sales of his 24 works reached an annual volume of over 400,000 copies.

Works
Mitchell's School Atlas, 1845—1857 General View of the World, Physical, Political, and Statistical, 1846Travellers' Guide through the United States'', 1850

References

External links

 Mitchell's Ancient Atlas digitized by Loyola University New Orleans

1790 births
1868 deaths
American geographers
People from Bristol, Connecticut
Scientists from Philadelphia